An emergency vehicle is a vehicle used by emergency services. Emergency vehicles typically have specialized emergency lighting and vehicle equipment that allow emergency services to reach calls for service in a timely manner, transport equipment and resources, or perform their tasks efficiently. Emergency vehicles are usually operated by authorized government agencies, but some may also be operated by private entities where permitted by law.

Emergency vehicles are usually given right of way in traffic, and may be exempted from certain basic road laws to reach their destinations in the fastest possible time, such as driving through a red traffic light or exceeding the speed limit; however, this is almost always done with emergency lights and sirens on, to alert traffic that the emergency vehicle is approaching. In some jurisdictions, the driver of an emergency vehicle can face legal action if the driver shows "reckless disregard for the safety of others".

Types
There are many types of emergency vehicles. Which service operates which vehicle depends on the jurisdiction. Examples of emergency vehicles include:

 Police
 Police car
 Police van
 Police motorcycle
 Police bicycle
 SWAT vehicle
 Mobile communications vehicle
 Police bus
 Police aviation
 Police watercraft

 Fire
 Fire engine
 Fire command vehicle
 Fire bike
 Light and air unit
 Water tender
 Aerial firefighting
 Fireboat

 Emergency medical services
 Ambulance
 Ambulance bus
 Nontransporting EMS vehicle
 Motorcycle ambulance
 Air medical services
 Water ambulance
 Other
 Rescue vehicle
 Hazardous materials apparatus
 Tow truck

Equipment

Many emergency response vehicles (especially those of the main police, fire and ambulance services) are likely to be fitted with audible and visual warning devices, which are designed to facilitate their movement through traffic to reach their destination, and to provide some protection on the scene.

Depending on local laws, vehicles on the road may be required to yield the right of way to emergency responders who are using their warning devices. For example, in Utah, when an emergency vehicle is on the road while using its warning devices, all cars are required to pull over to the side of the road, stop, and wait for the vehicle to pass before resuming normal driving, unless doing so would cause an accident or if stopped at a red light or stop sign. Even in areas where no such laws exist, many motorists may allow the vehicle to pass as a matter of courtesy.

Livery

Liveries are graphic designs on emergency vehicles that are intended to identify the vehicle's respective emergency service, improve visual identification, and differentiate emergency vehicles from regular traffic. Each service's design choices reflect different needs, but typically include:
 Identification of the service – Text or logos identifying the emergency service to which the vehicle belongs, and its purpose to the public and other services. Occasionally, the name of the service ("police", "ambulance", etc.) may be written in reverse lettering on the front of the vehicle; this lettering is reflected properly in rear-view mirrors.
 Vehicle ID number – A fleet number or unit number, typically printed on the roof, trunk, or fender of the emergency vehicle, allowing for easy internal identification and fleet maintenance.
 High visibility markings – A design or paint scheme that makes the emergency vehicle distinct or highly visible, and thus easily identifiable as an emergency vehicle from a distance. These can be as simple as unique paint schemes (such as black and white for police, or bright red for fire) or stripes, or as complex as Battenburg markings or intricate images evoking the jurisdiction they serve. Police are usually partially exempt from this, and they may be able to use unmarked police cars that lack any markings whatsoever, thus resembling civilian traffic. 
 Contact information – Appropriate contact information for the emergency service operating the emergency vehicle, or appropriate methods to request their assistance. The most common contact information printed on an emergency vehicle is an emergency telephone number, usually a national uniform number, but also a service's respective dedicated emergency number if they have one. The service's phone number or website link may also be used, though these are generally less emphasized so as to not confuse people who may be unfamiliar with a jurisdiction's emergency contact methods.

See also
 Automotive safety
 ISO 9001 certification
 ISO 14001 certification
 Emergency management
 Safety car
 Vehicle recovery

References

External links